I Trust You is a 2007 comedy film directed by Massimo Venier and starring comedy duo Ale e Franz.

Cast
Alessandro Besentini as Alessandro
Francesco Villa as Francesco
Maddalena Maggi as Veronica Orsini
Lucia Ocone as Susanna Besozzi
Ernesto Mahieux as Kappadue
Roberto Citran as Gaetano Aleotti
Paolo Pierobon as Guidoni
Emanuele Arrigazzi as Vladimir
Marco Marzocca as Pino
Nicola Savino as a waiter

References

External links
 

2007 comedy films
2007 films
Films directed by Massimo Venier
Italian comedy films
2000s Italian-language films